The quantitative precipitation forecast (abbreviated QPF) is the expected amount of melted precipitation accumulated over a specified time period over a specified area. A QPF will be created when precipitation amounts reaching a minimum threshold are expected during the forecast's valid period.  Valid periods of precipitation forecasts are normally synoptic hours such as 00:00, 06:00, 12:00 and 18:00 GMT.  Terrain is considered in QPFs by use of topography or based upon climatological precipitation patterns from observations with fine detail.  Starting in the mid-to-late 1990s, QPFs were used within hydrologic forecast models to simulate impact to rivers throughout the United States.  Forecast models show significant sensitivity to humidity levels within the planetary boundary layer, or in the lowest levels of the atmosphere, which decreases with height.  QPF can be generated on a quantitative, forecasting amounts, or a qualitative, forecasting the probability of a specific amount, basis.  Radar imagery forecasting techniques show higher skill than model forecasts within 6 to 7 hours of the time of the radar image.  The forecasts can be verified through use of rain gauge measurements, weather radar estimates, or a combination of both.  Various skill scores can be determined to measure the value of the rainfall forecast.

Use of radar

Algorithms exist to forecast rainfall based on short term radar trends, within a matter of hours.  Radar imagery forecasting techniques show higher skill than model forecasts within 6 to 7 hours of the time of the radar image.

Use of forecast models

In the past, the forecaster was responsible for generating the entire weather forecast based upon available observations. Today, meteorologists' input is generally confined to choosing a model based on various parameters, such as model biases and performance.  Using a consensus of forecast models, as well as ensemble members of the various models, can help reduce forecast error.  However, regardless how small the average error becomes with any individual system, large errors within any particularly piece of guidance are still possible on any given model run.  Professionals are required to interpret the model data into weather forecasts that are understandable to the lay person.  Professionals can use knowledge of local effects which may be too small in size to be resolved by the model to add information to the forecast.  As an example, terrain is considered in the QPF process by using topography or climatological precipitation patterns from observations with fine detail.  Using model guidance and comparing the various forecast fields to climatology, extreme events such as excessive precipitation associated with later flood events lead to better forecasts.  While increasing accuracy of forecast models implies that humans may no longer be needed in the forecast process at some point in the future, there is currently still a need for human intervention.

Nowcasting

The forecasting of the precipitation within the next six hours is often referred to as nowcasting. In this time range it is possible to forecast smaller features such as individual showers and thunderstorms with reasonable accuracy, as well as other features too small to be resolved by a computer model. A human given the latest radar, satellite and observational data will be able to make a better analysis of the small scale features present and so will be able to make a more accurate forecast for the following few hours. However, there are now expert systems using those data and mesoscale numerical model to make better extrapolation, including evolution of those features in time.

Ensemble forecasting

The detail that can be given into a forecast decreases with time as these errors increase. There comes a point when the errors are so large that the forecast has no correlation with the actual state of the atmosphere. Looking at a single forecast model gives no indication of how likely that forecast is to be correct. Ensemble forecasting entails the production of many forecasts in order to reflect the uncertainty in the initial state of the atmosphere (due to errors in the observations and insufficient sampling). The uncertainty in the forecast can then be assessed by the range of different forecasts produced. Ensemble forecasts are increasingly being used for operational weather forecasting (for example at European Centre for Medium-Range Weather Forecasts (ECMWF), National Centers for Environmental Prediction (NCEP), and the Canadian forecasting center). Ensemble mean forecasts for precipitation have the same problems associated with their use in other fields, as they average out more extreme values, and therefore have limited usefulness for extreme events.

Probability approach

In addition to graphical rainfall forecasts showing quantitative amounts, rainfall forecasts can be made describing the probabilities of certain rainfall amounts being met.  This allows the forecaster to assign the degree of uncertainty to the forecast.  This technique is considered to be informative, relative to climatology.  This method has been used for years within National Weather Service forecasts, as a period's chance of rain equals the chance that  will fall in any particular spot.  In this case, it is known as probability of precipitation.  These probabilities can be derived from a deterministic forecast using computer post-processing.

Entities which generate rainfall forecasts

Australia
The Bureau of Meteorology began a method of forecasting rainfall using a combination, or ensemble, of different forecast models in 2006.  It is termed The Poor Man's Ensemble (PME).  Its forecasts are more accurate over time than any of the individual models composing the ensemble.  The PME is quick to produce, and is available through their Water and the Land page on their website.

Hong Kong
The Hong Kong Observatory generates short term rainstorm warnings for systems which are expected to accumulate a certain amount of rainfall per hour over the next few hours. They use three levels of warning.

United States
Starting in the mid-to-late 1990s, QPFs were used within hydrologic forecast models to simulate impact of rainfall on river stages.

Verification

Rainfall forecasts can be verified a number of ways.  Rain gauge observations can be gridded into areal averages, which are then compared to the grids for the forecast models.  Weather radar estimates can be used outright, or corrected for rain gauge observations.

Several statistical scores can be based on the observed and forecast fields.  One, known as a bias, compares the size of the forecast field to the observed field, with the goal of a score of 1.  The threat score involves the intersection of the forecast and observed sets, with a maximum possible verification score of 1.  The probability of detection, or POD, is found by dividing the overlap between the forecast and observed fields by the size of the observed field:  the goal here is a score of 1.  The critical success index, or CSI, divides the overlap between the forecast and observed fields by the combined size of the forecast and observed fields:  the goal here is a score of 1.  The false alarm rate, or FAR, divides the area of the forecast which does not overlap the observed field by the size of the forecasted area.  The goal value in this measure is zero.

With tropical cyclones which impact the United States, the GFS global forecast model performed best in regards to its rainfall forecasts over the last few years, outperforming the NAM and ECMWF forecast models.

See also
Tropical cyclone rainfall forecasting
European Flood Alert System: using QPF and EPS for flood forecasting

References

External links
Hydrometeorological Prediction Center QPF for the lower 48 United States
Irrigation controller using QPF

Weather forecasting
Hydrology